Catalan Coexistence (CC) was a Catalonia-based party alliance led by the People's Alliance ahead of the 1977 Spanish general election.

Electoral performance

Cortes Generales

References

Defunct political party alliances in Spain
Defunct political parties in Catalonia
Political parties established in 1977
Political parties disestablished in 1977